Channel 7 is a local television station in Punta del Este, Uruguay, owned by Grupo Clarín. The station primarily rebroadcasts programs from co-owned Argentine network El Trece and from domestic broadcaster Canal 10, as well as local programming.

History 
The station began broadcasting on January 18, 1968. It was known as "Canal 9 del Este" and broadcast on channel 9. On July 7, 1991, after 23 years, the station moved to channel 7 in a swap with TeleRocha, which moved to channel 9. The station for years after the swap was known as "Canal 7 Cerro Pan de Azúcar", referring to its transmitter site and high-power facility.

References 

Television stations in Uruguay
Television channels and stations established in 1968
1968 establishments in Uruguay
Punta del Este